MacroMind was an Apple Macintosh software company founded in Chicago in 1984 by Marc Canter, Jamie Fenton and Mark Stephen Pierce. The company's first product was SoundVision, a combined music and graphics editor. Before the release, the graphics editor was removed, and SoundVision became MusicWorks. Along with other early programs, MusicWorks was originally distributed by Hayden Software.

In 1988 the company moved to San Francisco, and in 1991 MacroMind merged with Paracomp to become MacroMind–Paracomp, then in 1992 merged with Authorware Inc., forming Macromedia.

Products
MusicWorks (1984) - music composer
VideoWorks (1985), VideoWorks II (1987) and VideoWorks Interactive - multimedia animation software
Art Grabber/Body Shop (1985) - clip art software
Comic Works/Graphic Works - object based paint program
VideoWorks accelerator - animation compiler for VideoWorks files
MazeWars+ (1987) - multiplayer network game based on the classic Maze War
Director (1987) - new name for VideoWorks II
Director 2 (1988) - VideoWorks Interactive when released as a commercial product
Director 2.2 (1989 - Introduction of Lingo (programming language), an extensible animation scripting language
Director 3 (1989), and introduction of XObjects
Three-D (1990) - 3D modeling and animation software
MacroModel
 Renderworks (1990) - rendering software for Three-D files 
 Fireworks (1990) - post-production software for Renderworks renderings
Mouse Practice (1992) – a tutorial on how to use the mouse where the user controls a scuba diver

See also
Marc Canter - CEO and co-founder of MacroMind

References

External links
Mark Stephen Pierce's resume
Download MazeWars+
Computer chronicles: Desktop Publishing #1 (11/2/1986) - demo of desktop publishing software including MacroMind Comic Works

Macintosh software companies